War of the Ring is a 1976 board wargame published by Fantasy Games Unlimited. It is based on the Middle-earth works of J. R. R. Tolkien.

Gameplay
War of the Ring is a two player game with one player as Gondor and one player as Mordor as they compete to control the One Ring.

Reception
Tony Watson reviewed War of the Ring in The Space Gamer No. 12. Watson commented that "The game plays well as game, but the use of a Diplomacy type system in a game of this nature is questionable."

In the 1978 White Dwarf gaming magazine (Issue 05) it was reviewed by Mike Westhead. He gave it a score of 5 out of 10, disliking the presentation, expense, rule ambiguities and the fact it had no control markers.

References

Board games based on Middle-earth
Board games introduced in 1976
Fantasy Games Unlimited games